Hendry Antonay (born 22 May 2000) is an Indian footballer who plays as a defender for Indian club Odisha in the Indian Super League. He Also Represented India In The FIFA U-17 World Cup in 2017.

Club career
Born in Karnataka, Antonay made his senior debut with Indian Super League side Chennaiyin and has also represented Chennaiyin B particularly in I-League II. He captained Chennaiyin FC B in the Durand Cup

Indian Arrows
In 2019, Hendry Antonay was loaned from Chennaiyin FC to Indian Arrows.On 6 December 2020, Hendry Antoany made his debut for I- League side Indian Arrows  against Gokulam Kerala FC.He came on as a 75th minute substitute for the Ajin Tom as the match ended in 0–1 victory for Gokulam Kerala.

Odisha
On 5 June 2020 , Hendry Antoany joined Indian Super League club Odisha FC. On 23 November 2020 , Hendry Antonay made his debut for Indian super league side Odisha against Hyderabad FC.The match ended in a 0–1 victory for Hyderabad FC.

International career
Hendry Antonay has also represented India U-17 as well. He was in the squad for FIFA U-17 World Cup in India. He has maiden appearance of it.

Career statistics

Club

References

External links
Aiff profile

2000 births
Living people
Association football defenders
Indian footballers
Footballers from Bangalore
I-League 2nd Division players
I-League players
Indian Super League players
Chennaiyin FC players
Indian Arrows players
Odisha FC players
Chennaiyin FC B players
India youth international footballers